Lancashire is an unincorporated community in New Castle County, Delaware, United States. Lancashire is located southeast of the intersection of Delware routes 3 and 92, northeast of Wilmington.

References 

Unincorporated communities in New Castle County, Delaware
Unincorporated communities in Delaware